, also known as , was founded in October 1935 in Kobe and is Japan's first masjid. Its construction was funded by donations collected by the Islamic Committee of Kobe from 1928 until its opening in 1935. The mosque was confiscated by the Imperial Japanese Navy in 1943. However, it continues to function as mosque today. It is located in the Kitano-cho foreign district of Kobe. The mosque survived the air raids that laid waste to most of Kobe's urban districts in 1945 and was able to endure through the Great Hanshin earthquake in 1995. The mosque is located in one of Kobe's best-known tourist areas, which features many old western style buildings.

The mosque was built in traditional Indo-Islamic style by the Czech architect Jan Josef Švagr (1885–1969), the architect of a number of Western religious buildings throughout Japan. In recent years There are more than 110 mosques in Japan.

See also
Islam
Islam in Japan
List of mosques in Asia
Religion in Japan

References

External links

 

1935 establishments in Japan
Buildings and structures in Kobe
Mosques completed in 1935
Mosques in Japan
Religious buildings and structures in Hyōgo Prefecture
Tourist attractions in Kobe